Miss-Sénégal is a national Beauty pageant in Senegal.

History
Miss Senegal was founded in 1960 by the Ministry of Tourism, Senegal. The winner becomes national goodwill ambassador of her country. In January 2016, Miss Senegal rights belong to Amina Colle Badiane as the new president of Miss Senegal. She has evolved over many years in Europe (especially Italy and France) as a professional model. Subsequently, it was also host and presenter at major Italian television channels.

Organizers
2016—Amina Badiane SE.CO.BA (Communication Service Badiane) Directorship
1985—Moise Ambroise Gomis Directorship
1974—Government of Tourism in Senegal

Formats
The first edition of Miss Senegal Nouvelle Vision has achieved its objective of reviving Senegal's cultural and tourist assets at both national and international level. It allowed the organization of 14 regional finals and the National Grand Final which closed the edition.

Franchise holders
As tradition the main winner usually competed at Miss Universe pageant. Began new foundation in 2016 the Miss Senegal purposed to return at Miss Universe pageant. It stills unknown that the country might comeback after so many years did not present at Miss Universe competition. In recent moment the President of Miss Senegal received a mandatory to send a winner to upcoming Miss World began in 2019.

Titleholders

References

External links
misssenegal.sn

Beauty pageants in Senegal
Recurring events established in 1960
Senegal
Senegalese awards